ABC Kinglake Ranges was a temporary radio service broadcasting from Kinglake, Victoria, Australia, to areas in the Shire of Murrindindi affected by the Black Saturday bushfires of 2009. The station was first broadcast on 9 March 2009, initially from a makeshift transmitter on 97.1FM. Coverage extended to the towns of Flowerdale and Hazeldene through the local repeater of the Wodonga-based ABC Goulburn Murray service.

The station broadcast a local breakfast program, presented from the studios of 774 ABC Melbourne by Louise Fitzroy. A mornings program was presented from temporary studios in Kinglake by Simon Foster, with additional community-focused programming and simulcasts of national programming from ABC Local Radio.

In July 2009, the service ceased broadcasting after five months on air. Alexandra-based UGFM commenced operation of a permanent community radio station on 94.5FM in Kinglake from 6 September 2009.

See also
 Reactions to the Black Saturday bushfire crisis
 Community radio

References

Kinglake Ranges
Radio stations in Victoria
Radio stations established in 2009
Radio stations disestablished in 2009
2009 establishments in Australia
2009 disestablishments in Australia